Drieziek is a suburb in Johannesburg, South Africa. It is located in Region G of the City of Johannesburg Metropolitan Municipality.

Infrastructure

Drieziek Taxi Facility 
Drieziek Taxi Facility  is a newly constructed modern facility which boasts a public square, toilets and parking, which will enable motorists to park their cars and hitch a taxi ride.

Library 
The state of the art library has a designated children’s area and upon completion will be serviced by about 10 staff members.

Multipurpose Center 
From a learning perspective, the centre offers learning facilitation through a state-of-the-art library, a craft centre to facilitate artistic expression and growth, and an amphitheatre for community-organised shows, presentations and recitals.

Education & Other 
Drieziek houses a few primary to high schools including:
 Reamohetsoe Primary School
 Amsai PrivatePrimary School
 Itemoheng Primary School
 Govan Mbeki Primary School
 Thetha Secondary School

Other 
 Ananda Jayanthi Centre For Community Development is working in Secondary education activities.
 Masibambane College & Community Center is located ~3 km from Drieziek

Other places of interest 
Eyethu Orange Farm Mall is ~4 km away from the Drieziek suburb

Notable persons 
 Ntando Duma
 Mbuyiseni Ndlozi

References

Johannesburg Region G